Urodeta spatulata is a moth of the family Elachistidae. It is found in Kenya.

The wingspan is 3.9–4.9 mm. The forewings are yellowish brown, weakly mottled by darker tips of the scales. Blackish-brown scales form two irregular patches and blackish-brown scales form two small spots. The fringe scales are brownish grey with irregularly scattered blackish brown-tipped scales. The hindwings, including the fringe, are brownish grey.

Etymology
The species name refers to the broad, spatulate apex of the phallus in the male genitalia and is derived from Latin spatula (meaning a broad paddle).

References

Endemic moths of Kenya
Elachistidae
Moths described in 2009
Moths of Africa